Padenia is a genus of moths in the subfamily Arctiinae described by Frederic Moore in 1882.

Description
Palpi porrect (extending forward), reaching beyond the frons. Antennae minutely ciliated in both sexes with long spurs in tibia. Forewings with highly arched costa. Male with veins 3 and 4 from far before end of cell. Veins 5 and 6 absent. Veins 7 to 9 stalked. Female with vein 3 from near angle of cell. Veins 4 and 5 stalked, and vein 6 absent. Hindwings of male excised at apex with a fringe of long hair on apical portion of costa. vein 6 absent. Female with veins 3 and 4 stalked. Vein 5 from angle of cell, veins 6 and 7 stalked, vein 8 from near end of cell. Forewings of male with a strong costal fold and female has a slight fold.

Species
 Padenia acutifascia De Joannis, 1928
 Padenia bifasciatus Rothschild, 1912
 Padenia cupreifascia Rothschild, 1912
 Padenia duplicana Walker, 1863
 Padenia intermedia van Eecke, 1929
 Padenia moluccensis van Eecke, 1920
 Padenia obliquifascia Rothschild, 1920
 Padenia sordida Rothschild, 1912
 Padenia transversa Walker, 1854
 Padenia triseparata Debauche, 1938

References

Lithosiini
Moth genera